The 2020 Duke Blue Devils women's soccer team represented Duke University during the 2020 NCAA Division I women's soccer season.  The Blue Devils were led by head coach Robbie Church, in his twentieth season.  They played home games at Koskinen Stadium.  This was the team's 33rd season playing organized women's college soccer and their 33rd playing in the Atlantic Coast Conference.

Due to the COVID-19 pandemic, the ACC played a reduced schedule in 2020 and the NCAA Tournament was postponed to 2021.  The ACC did not play a spring league schedule, but did allow teams to play non-conference games that would count toward their 2020 record in the lead up to the NCAA Tournament.

The Blue Devils finished the fall season 7–4–2, 4–2–2 in ACC play to finish in sixth place.  As the fifth seed in the ACC Tournament, they defeated Clemson before losing to eventual champions Florida State in the Semifinals.  The Blue Devils finished the spring season 3–1–1 and received an at-large bid to the NCAA Tournament.  In the tournament, they defeated Arizona State in the Second Round and Ole Miss in the Third Round before losing to Florida State in the Quarterfinals, on penalties to end their season.

Previous season 
The Blue Devils finished the season 9–4–7, 3–1–6 in ACC play to finish in fifth place.  As the sixth seed in the ACC Tournament, they lost to Virginia in the Quarterfinals.  They received an at-large bid to the NCAA Tournament where they defeated Utah before losing to Wisconsin in the Second Round.

Squad

Roster

Updated January 27, 2021

Team management

Source:

Schedule 
Source:

|-
!colspan=6 style=""| Fall Regular season

|-
!colspan=6 style=""| ACC Tournament

|-
!colspan=6 style=""| Spring Regular season

|-
!colspan=6 style=""| NCAA Tournament

2021 NWSL College Draft

Source:

Rankings

Fall 2020

Spring 2021

References

Duke
2020 in sports in North Carolina
Duke
Duke Blue Devils women's soccer seasons